The 2008 A Championship was the inaugural season of the A Championship in Ireland. The league featured 16 teams. UCD A were the inaugural champions, Cork City A won the Shield competition and Mervue United were promoted to the First Division after a play off.

A Championship Shield
Between March and June the twelve League of Ireland Premier Division reserve teams competed in the A Championship Shield.  Mervue United, Salthill Devon and Tullamore Town did not play in the Shield as they were still playing in their previous junior/intermediate leagues which operated as winter leagues. This resulted in an overlap with the A Championship which operated as a summer league. The twelve teams were divided into four regionalised groups with the group winners then qualifying for the semi-finals.
Group Stage

Semi-finals

Final

Regular season
The regular season saw the twelve League of Ireland Premier Division reserve teams joined by Limerick 37 A plus the first teams of Mervue United, Salthill Devon and Tullamore Town. The format saw the sixteen teams split into two groups of eight, divided roughly into southern and northern  groups. The two groups used a traditional round-robin format. The two group winners, UCD A and Bohemians A, then played off in a final. UCD won the inaugural title. As the highest placed non-reserve team, Mervue United qualified for a promotion/relegation play-off and after defeating Kildare County, they were promoted to the League of Ireland First Division.

Group 1

Teams

Final table

Results

Group 2

Teams

Final table

Results

Play-Offs

A Championship Final
Bohemians A and UCD A competed in a playoff to decide the  overall A Championship title. UCD A won 2–1.

Promotion/Relegation
Kildare County and Mervue United, the highest ranked non-reserve team from the A Championship, played off to see who would play in the 2009 First Division. 

Mervue United won 5–2 on aggregate and were promoted to the First Division.

See also
 2008 League of Ireland Premier Division
 2008 League of Ireland First Division
 2008 League of Ireland Cup

References

 
3
A Championship seasons
Ireland
Ireland